Orange Center Historic District is a historic district encompassing the historic civic, commercial, and industrial heart of Orange, Massachusetts in the United States. It was listed on the National Register of Historic Places in 1989.

Description and history
The area that is now the center of Orange was settled around 1785, when a bridge was built across the Millers River, which flows through it in a westerly direction toward the Connecticut River. The town grew in the first half of the 19th century as an industrial area, and its growth increased substantially with the arrival of the railroad in 1846. It became widely known in the second half of the 19th century for the manufacture of sewing machines. The town's economy declined during the Great Depression, and has been at a lower ebb since then.

The historic district is roughly linear, extending north–south along North and South Main Streets from School Street in the north to River Street on the south side of the Miller River. It extends for a short distance along East and West Main Streets. Also included are the town hall (built 1868), two churches, railroad-related infrastructure including a surviving freight house, and the Grand Army of the Republic Hall. At the northern end of North Main Street are a few period residences, including the ornate Italianate French House that now serves as the home to the local historical society.

See also
 National Register of Historic Places listings in Franklin County, Massachusetts
 Orange Center Historic District (disambiguation)

References

Historic districts on the National Register of Historic Places in Massachusetts
Geography of Franklin County, Massachusetts
National Register of Historic Places in Franklin County, Massachusetts